Kempinski (feminine: Kempinska, plural: Kempinscy) is a Polish surname. In other form: Kempiński (Kempińska, Kempińscy), Kempinsky. Notable people with the surname include: 

A. Kempinsky (1918–1972), Polish psychiatrist and philosopher
Berthold Kempinski (1843–1910), Polish hotelier
Charlie Kempinska (born 1938), American football player 
Gerhard Kempinski (1904–1947), German-born actor
Robert Kempiński (born 1977), Polish chess grandmaster
Tom Kempinski (born 1938), English playwright and actor

Fictional
Leonard Kempinski, character from the British ITV soap opera, Emmerdale

See also
Kępiński

Polish-language surnames